Rough Justice is a 1970 Italian Western film directed by Mario Costa and starring Klaus Kinski.

Cast
 Klaus Kinski - Johnny Laster
 Gabriella Giorgelli - Juanita
 Steven Tedd - Riccardo
 Giovanni Pallavicino - Machete
 Andrea Aureli - Riccardo's Father
 Remo Capitani
 Giuliano Raffaelli - Gary Pinkerton
 Paolo Casella - Glen (as Paul Sullivan)
 Grazia Di Marzà
 Fiona Florence
 Gioia Garson 
 Cristina Iosani - (as Cristina Josani)
 Vittorio Mangano
 Ivana Novak
 Pilù
 Guido Lollobrigida - Logan (as Lee Burton)
 Luisa Rivelli
 Antonio Anelli
 Bruno Arié
 Bruno Boschetti
 Carla Mancini
 Sergio Scarchilli

References

External links

1970 films
1970s Italian-language films
1970 Western (genre) films
Spaghetti Western films
Films scored by Stelvio Cipriani
Films directed by Mario Costa
1970s Italian films